Brian Tennyson (born July 10, 1962) is a retired American golfer.

Tennyson was born in Evansville, Indiana. He played college golf at Ball State University. He was twice named as an NCAA All-American in 1982 and 1983; in 1984, the Golf Coaches Association named him an All-American. He was a three-time All-MAC golfer (1982-84) and the team MVP in 1982 and 1984. He led the Cardinals to the 1982 Conference title, he tied for first but lost in the playoff.

Tennyson turned professional in 1984. He played on the Asia Golf Circuit, winning twice in 1987. He played on the PGA Tour from 1988 to 1992. His best finishes were T-2 at the 1989 Hardee's Golf Classic and the 1990 Bob Hope Chrysler Classic. 

When his golf game diminished in 1991 and 1992, Tennyson quit golf and accepted a job in October 1992 as vice president of strategic planning at Papa John's Pizza – he had been roommates with Papa John's founder, John Schnatter at Ball State. He helped take the company public in June 1993. Unhappy with a corporate job, Tennyson quit in April 1994 and decided to resume his golf career. He returned to the PGA Tour in 1996 where he had one top-10 finish, T-9 at the Quad City Classic. He played on the Buy.com Tour (now Web.com Tour) from 1998 to 2000 where his best finish was second at the 1999 Nike Dayton Open.

After retiring from golf in 2001, Tennyson worked as a studio analyst at Golf Channel and Fox Sports. He also started his own business. He regained his amateur status in 2008.

Amateur wins
this list may be incomplete
8 intercollegiate events from 1980–84

Professional wins (3)

Asia Golf Circuit wins (2)
1987 San Miguel Philippine Open, Charminar Challenge Indian Open

Other wins
this list may be incomplete
1990 Palm Beach Golf Classic (with Ken Green)

Results in major championships

Note: Tennyson never played in The Open Championship

CUT = missed the half-way cut
"T" = tied

See also
1987 PGA Tour Qualifying School graduates
1995 PGA Tour Qualifying School graduates

References

External links

American male golfers
Ball State Cardinals men's golfers
PGA Tour golfers
Golfers from Indiana
Sportspeople from Evansville, Indiana
Sportspeople from Fullerton, California
1962 births
Living people